Rock the Night: The Very Best of Europe is a compilation album by Europe, which was released on 3 March 2004 by Sony Music.

Unlike 1982–1992, which was put together by vocalist Joey Tempest on his own, the track listing for Rock the Night was decided by all the members of the band.

Track listing

Disc one
"Rock the Night" (Tempest) – 4.04
"Superstitious" (Tempest) – 4.34
"I'll Cry for You" [acoustic] (Tempest, Graham) – 3.58
"Cherokee" (Tempest) – 4.40
"Stormwind" (Tempest) – 4.28
"Sweet Love Child" (Tempest, Marcello, Michaeli) – 4.56
"In the Future to Come" (Tempest) – 5.00
"Here Comes the Night" (Tempest) – 4.26
"Sign of the Times" (Tempest) – 4.15
"Dreamer" (Tempest) – 4.26
"Seventh Sign" (Tempest, Marcello, Michaeli) – 4.41
"Yesterday's News" (Tempest, Marcello, Levén, Haugland, Michaeli) – 5.26
"Got Your Mind in the Gutter" (Tempest, Hill, Marcello) – 4.59
"Ready or Not" (Tempest) – 4.05
"Aphasia" [instrumental] (Norum) – 2.30
"Time Has Come" [live at Solnahallen, Stockholm 1986] (Tempest) – 4.31

Disc two
"The Final Countdown" (Tempest)
"Halfway to Heaven" (Tempest, John, Rice)
"Open Your Heart" [original version] (Tempest)
"Long Time Coming" (Tempest)
"Mr. Government Man" (Tempest, Hill)
"Carrie" (Tempest, Michaeli)
"Seven Doors Hotel" [B-side version] (Tempest)
"Girl from Lebanon" (Tempest)
"The King Will Return" (Tempest)
"More Than Meets the Eye" (Tempest, Marcello, Michaeli)
"Prisoners in Paradise" (Tempest)
"Wings of Tomorrow" (Tempest)
"On Broken Wings" (Tempest)
"Scream of Anger" (Tempest, Jacob)
"Heart of Stone" (Tempest)
"Let the Good Times Rock" [live at Ahoy Stadium, Rotterdam 1989] (Tempest)

Personnel
Joey Tempest – vocals, acoustic guitar, keyboards
John Norum – guitar, backing vocals
Kee Marcello – guitar, backing vocals
John Levén – bass
Mic Michaeli – keyboards, backing vocals
Ian Haugland – drums, backing vocals
Tony Reno – drums
Nate Winger – backing vocals
Paul Winger – backing vocals
Elisabet Löwa – Compilation Producer & Project Coordination
Björn Almstedt, Cutting Room – Mastering
Henrik Jonsson, Polar Mastering – Additional Mastering
Michael Johansson – Photography
Jon Edergen, Electric Boogie – Artwork

2004 greatest hits albums
Europe (band) compilation albums